Vladyslav Viktorovych Shynkarenko (born 27 January 2001) is a professional Ukrainian football midfielder who plays for Nikopol on loan from Dnipro-1.

Career
Shynkarenko is a product of the Parus and the Dnipro youth sportive schools in his native city and in July 2019 he signed a contract with Ukrainian side SC Dnipro-1 and played for its in the Ukrainian Premier League Reserves and Under 19 Championship. 

In December 2020 he was promoted to the main squad to play in the Ukrainian Premier League. Shynkarenko made his debut in the Ukrainian Premier League for SC Dnipro-1 as a second-half substituted player on 6 December 2020, playing in a losing away match against FC Zorya Luhansk.

References

External links
 
 

2001 births
Living people
Footballers from Dnipro
Ukrainian footballers
FC Dnipro players
SC Dnipro-1 players
FC Nikopol players
Ukrainian Premier League players
Ukrainian Second League players
Ukrainian Amateur Football Championship players
Association football midfielders